Zdzisław Michalski (11 February 1928 – 28 September 1985) was a Polish rower who competed in the 1952 Summer Olympics.

References

1928 births
1985 deaths
Polish male rowers
Olympic rowers of Poland
Rowers at the 1952 Summer Olympics
Place of birth missing